The 1975 Roanoke International, also known as the Roanoke Invitational Tennis Tournament,  was a men's tennis tournament played on indoor carpet courts at the Roanoke Civic Center in Roanoke, Virginia, in the United States that was part of the 1975 USLTA-IPA Indoor Circuit. It was the fourth and last edition of the event and was held from January 29 through February 2, 1975. Unseeded Roger Taylor won the singles title.

Finals

Singles
 Roger Taylor defeated   Vitas Gerulaitis 7–6, 7–6
 It was Taylor's 1st singles title of the year and the 8th of his career.

Doubles
 Vitas Gerulaitis /  Sandy Mayer defeated  Juan Gisbert Sr. /  Ion Țiriac 7–6, 1–6, 6–3

References

External links
 ITF tournament edition details

Roanoke International
Roanoke International
Roanoke International